Roberto José Mouras (February 16, 1948 – November 22, 1992) was an Argentine racing driver. He won the 1983, 1984 and 1985 Turismo Carretera championships, also he won 50 races in this series between his debut in 1970 and his fatal accident in 1992.

Racing career 
Roberto Mouras started his racing career in the 60s. He made his debut in Turismo Carretera in 1970, driving a Torino.

He switched to Chevrolet in 1975 and made his first victory in 1976, at Bahía Blanca. He won the next five races, achieving a total of six consecutive wins that remain a record to this day. But despite this, Mouras lost the championship to Héctor Gradassi.

In 1980, Mouras changed the brand again, going from Chevrolet to Dodge. With Dodge, Mouras achieved his greatest successes, as he won all three championships in 1983, 1984 and 1985, in addition to a small tournament disputed in late 1981. Of Mouras' 50 wins, 27 were in his period with Dodge between 1981 and 1985.

In 1986, Mouras returned to Chevrolet. He won a total of 15 races after this.

Death 
He died on November 22, 1992, during a race in Lobos, the penultimate race of that year. Mouras's car had the left front tire blowout, causing him to lose control of the car and hit a mound of dirt. The violence of the impact caused severe damage to the left side of the car, killing Mouras almost instantly. In the accident, his co-driver Amadeo González was also injured. He died two days later.

The race was immediately suspended with a red flag. For this, Mouras declared the winner of the race. His 50th victory at Turismo Carretera.

Legacy 
In his memory, the Autódromo Roberto Mouras in La Plata bears his name. A thematic museum in Carlos Casares about his life and career. In Lobos, Mouras is honored at the accident site.

References

External links
 

1948 births

1992 deaths
Argentine racing drivers
Turismo Carretera drivers
Racing drivers who died while racing
Sport deaths in Argentina
Filmed deaths in motorsport